HSwMS Uppland (Upd) is a submarine in the Swedish Navy. The motto of HSwMS Uppland is "Prudencia Et Audacia" which translates into "Prudence And Boldness".

Mid-life upgrade 
In 2020, HSwMS Uppland underwent a mid-life update. During the upgrade, a number of systems that will be used in the next generation submarines, the Blekinge-class (A26), were installed. More than 20 new systems on board the new Gotland-class was implemented, which contributes to their de-risking for the A26. This also offers training opportunities for the crew when they deploy the A26 in the future.

The upgrade process included many new systems, such as the Stirling AIP, a completely new mast suite, sonars and sensors as well as management and communication systems. In order to accommodate all systems, the submarine has extended to 62 m and gained another 200 tons in weight. In the process HSwMS Uppland reached a displacement (surfaced) of 1580 tons.

Gotland-class submarines
Ships built in Malmö
1996 ships
Submarines of Sweden